Airy is a lunar impact crater located in the southern highlands. It is named in honour of British astronomer George Biddell Airy. It forms the southernmost member of a chain of craters consisting of Vogel, Argelander, and Airy. A little further to the south lies Donati. Airy has a worn, and somewhat polygonal rim that it broken at the northern and southern ends. It has an irregular floor and a central peak.

Satellite craters
By convention these features are identified on lunar maps by placing the letter on the side of the crater midpoint that is closest to Airy.

References

External links

Airy at The Moon Wiki
 

Impact craters on the Moon